is a Japanese politician of the Democratic Party of Japan, a member of the House of Councillors in the Diet (national legislature). A graduate of Sophia University, he was elected to the House of Councillors for the first time in 2007 after working at Fuji Television for 17 years.

References

External links 
 Official website in Japanese.

Members of the House of Councillors (Japan)
1965 births
Living people
Democratic Party of Japan politicians